Antonio Miço (born 27 January 2000) is a Greek professional footballer of Albanian descent who plays as a centre-back for Karmiotissa Pano Polemidion.

References

2000 births
Living people
Greek people of Albanian descent
Footballers from Athens
Greek footballers
Super League Greece players
Super League Greece 2 players
Panionios F.C. players
Terrassa FC footballers
Ergotelis F.C. players
Association football defenders
Greek expatriate footballers
Expatriate footballers in Spain
Greek expatriate sportspeople in Spain